The Church of St Laurence is a Grade I listed building in the village of Stanwick in North Northamptonshire.  It was originally within the Church of England Diocese of Lincoln but was transferred to the Diocese of Peterborough in 1541 towards the end of the Dissolution of the Monasteries during Henry VIII's reign.

History
Many earlier records incorrectly recorded the name of the church as “St Lawrence” instead of “St Laurence”.  For example The Buildings of England: Northamptonshire and Architectural Notices of the Churches of the Archdeaconry of Northampton.  Historic England's National Heritage List for England was corrected in 2014.

The Church consists of an octagonal west Tower and Spire, Nave, Chancel, south Aisle, south Porch and Parvise.

The string-course on the Nave, and the serrated hood of the east side of the Chancel-arch, prove that the original Church of Stanwick consisted of Nave and Chancel of about 1200. In about 1230 the Tower, south Aisle and porch were probably added. The Spire was not finished till the beginning of the 14th century. Later a Perpendicular Chancel was substituted for the original structure, a few Decorated windows were inserted, and some reparation continued at intervals, until the parvise, the low roof, and the battlement completed the work. A rebuilding of the Chancel occurred in 1823.

The Tower is an octagon, but the north-east and south-east sides are filled up with the Tower stairs, so that a square face is presented to the body of the church, without disturbing the spirit of an octagonal arrangement.

The original fabric of the Nave is earlier than that of the Tower and the Chancel.  There have been perpendicular insertions in the Nave and the Chancel was rebuilt in the 15th or 16th century, and again restored in the early 19th century.  The present Chancel is about three feet narrower than the original one.

The Porch is original, the outer door having jamb-shafts of Early English character. There is no clerestory. The battlements throughout the Church are Perpendicular.

In Richard Cumberland’s memoirs, he writes “The Spire of Stanwick Church is esteemed one of the most beautiful models in that style of architecture in the kingdom ; my father (Denison Cumberland) added a very handsome clock, and ornamented the Chancel with a railing, screen, and entablature upon three-quarter columns, with a singing gallery at the west end, and spared no expense to keep his Church not only in that neatness and decorum, which befits the house of prayer, but also in a perfect state of good and permanent repair.”

The pulpit was presented by John Dolben, Bishop of Rochester, and once Rector of Stanwick in 1778.

The weathercock is 157 feet above ground, and was given to the church in 1882 by George Henson the then landlord of the Duke of Wellington inn.

Rectors (known)
The following list is based on the Clergy of the Church of England database (CCEd) and a plaque in the church.  The spelling of names may change as early names were spelt in Old English, Middle English or Medieval Latin.
  
1224 Ralph of Collingham
1232 Ralph of Norwich
1258 Richard de Hereford
1266 Reginaldus
1267 John de Lovetoft
1302 Roger de Scardebury
1320 William de Casterton
1343 Thomas de Wynceby
1369 Richard Travers
1404 John Nowell
1424 Robert Sutton
1438 Richard Raynhill
1439 John Chichele
1460 John of Yate
1460 John Manningham
1478 John Bedford
1493 John Harryson
1539 William Buckmaster
1545 Robert Wynnall
1546 Richard Gill
1554 John Smyth
1564 Oliver Barlow
1568 Abraham Hartewell (or Hardwell)
1608 John Major
1608 Richard Cleburne
1623 William Dolben 
1631 Henry Willis
1666 Edward Norris
1673 John Lambe
1717 Peter Needham
1731 Denison Cumberland
1777 Samuel Knight
1790 William Procter
1793 Charles Proby
1822 George Rowley
1838 John Sergeaunt
1858 Charles Boulby
1863 James Gandy
1873 George Mansfield
1882 James Bonner
1895 Henry Barnacle
1899 Frank Daniels
1904 Henry Richards
1919 Joseph Dollar
1924 Charles Swann
1926 John Ford
1928 William Hamerton
1944 Frederick Taylor
1952 Dennis Brown
1958 John Eagle
1988 Arthur Royford
1995 Elizabeth Wood
2004 Shena Bell
2018 Jonathan Aldwinckle
2023 Awaitinjg confirmation

References

External links

Find a Church in the Church of England ("A Church Near You")
4 Spires Benefice (Hargrave, Raunds, Ringstead and Stanwick)

Stanwick
Stanwick
North Northamptonshire